Port Talbot Steelworks is an integrated steel production plant in Port Talbot, West Glamorgan, Wales, capable of producing nearly 5 million tonnes of steel slab per annum. This makes it the larger of the two major steel plants in the UK and one of the largest in Europe. Over 4,000 people work at the plant. The majority of the slab is rolled on-site at Port Talbot and at the Newport Llanwern site to make a variety of steel strip products. The remainder is processed at other Tata Steel plants or sold in slab form.  The works covers a large area of land which dominates the east of the town. Its two blast furnaces and steel production plant buildings are major landmarks visible from both the M4 motorway and the South Wales Main Line when passing through the town.

History

The site at Margam is made up of a number of plants across a large site, developed since 1901.

Port Talbot works
The original works were built by Gilbertson, and situated south of Port Talbot railway station. Constructed in 1901–5, the works was named after Christopher Rice Mansel Talbot of Margam Castle, the principal sponsor of the developments at Port Talbot docks, which had opened in 1837.

The site was closed in 1961 and demolished in 1963. The General Offices housed Port Talbot magistrates' court until 2012, but the rest of the site is an industrial estate.

Margam works
Steelmaking at the Port Talbot complex began with the Margam Iron and Steel Works, completed between 1923 and 1926.

Abbey works

Abbey Steelworks was planned in 1947, but today is correctly termed Tata Steel Strip Products UK Port Talbot Works. It is believed to be named after the Cistercian Margam Abbey that used to be on the site – a small amount of the original building still stands (protected) within the site that survived the dissolution of the monasteries. Several steel manufacturers in South Wales pooled their resources to form the Steel Company of Wales, to construct a modern integrated steelworks on a site then owned by Guest, Keen and Baldwins. However, political manoeuvring led to tinplate production being retained in its original heartland further west, at two new works in Trostre and Felindre. The steelworks were built upon 32,000 piles into sand and peat. Opened in 1951, it was fully operational by 1953.

Once the new No.4 and 5 furnaces began production, the older furnaces, numbers 1 and 2 built in the 1920s, were demolished. No.3 furnace, built in 1941, was retained and used as a stand-by, until demolished in the mid-2000s. At the time of peak employment in the 1960s, the Abbey Works was Europe's largest steelworks and the largest single employer in Wales, with a labour force of 18,000.

In 1967, The Steel Company of Wales was nationalised and absorbed into British Steel Corporation, which was subsequently privatised and merged to form Corus Group. Tata Group agreed to purchase all Corus' ordinary shares in March 2007, and the deal was concluded in April 2007.  In 2010 it was announced that Corus was to be rebranded to the group name of Tata Steel Europe.

Today

An integrated steelmaking site using imported ore and coal, together with Llanwern steelworks, the plants produced up to 3.5 million tonnes of hot rolled and cold rolled annealed steel coils per annum, for a variety of different end uses. Output is taken by rail from Margam Knuckle Yard to: Shotton  for coating; Trostre for tinplating;  or direct to the Midlands motor industry and domestic goods.

Top Gear have used the Port Talbot steelworks a number of times to film.

Financial challenges
Tata Steel announced on 30 March 2016 it may pull out of its UK operations, including Port Talbot.  It provided as reasons "imports of Chinese steel, high energy costs and weak demand ". "Plans to save the steelworks were put on hold when potential buyers indicated their intention to withdraw from the bidding process due to the UK voting in favour of withdrawing from the EU" . However, the Brexit vote had the opposite effect with Tata Steel reconfirming commitment to the self-sustaining finance of its UK operations, while selling the EU - Netherlands operations. The UK Government said it "remains committed to supporting a sustainable, long-term future for steel making in the UK".

Fatal accidents
An explosion at the Port Talbot plant in November 2001 killed three men. Len Radford, 53, Stephen Galsworthy, 25, and Andrew Hutin, 20, died when blast furnace five erupted, sending molten liquid down on them. Twelve other men were seriously injured in the blast. The blast heavily damaged No.5, which was rebuilt and resumed operation from 2003 onwards.

In July 2012 Tata Steel were fined £500,000 over the 2006 death of worker Kevin Downey at the Port Talbot plant. Engulfed in steam during a night shift, Downey wandered into a channel of molten slag heated to 1500 °C. He was rescued by colleagues, but suffered 85% burns and died later that day. At the time of the accident, the Port Talbot plant was controlled by Corus Steel UK, and taken over by Tata in 2007.

Nearest places
Port Talbot docks
Taibach
Margam
Eglwys Nunydd reservoir
Kenfig

References

External links
 
BBC - South West Wales in pictures:Port Talbot Slideshow Tour
University of Leicester - A South Wales Blast Furnace - Twentieth century heavy industry, Port Talbot, Glamorgan
 The Abbey Works

Tata Steel Europe
Buildings and structures in Port Talbot
Ironworks and steelworks in Wales